John Thomas Wright (4 May 1878 – 11 June 1968) was an Australian rules footballer who played with Geelong in the Victorian Football League (VFL).

Family
The son of Isaiah 'Wild' Wright (1849-1911) who famously fought Ned Kelly in a bare knuckle fight at Beechworth on 8 August 1874, and Bridget Wright, née Lloyd (1855-1884), John Thomas Wright was born at Mansfield, Victoria on 4 May 1878.

Notes

References

External links 

 
 

1878 births
1968 deaths
Australian rules footballers from Victoria (Australia)
Australian Rules footballers: place kick exponents
Geelong Football Club players
Australian military personnel of World War I
Military personnel from Victoria (Australia)